Ludwig Diestel (28 September 1825 – 15 May 1879) was a German Protestant theologian born in Königsberg.

He studied at several universities and in 1851 became a lecturer at the University of Bonn. In 1858 at Bonn he became an associate professor of theology. Later on, he served as a professor at the Universities of Greifswald (1862), Jena (1867) and Tübingen (1872).

Diestel was known for his liberal-minded theological views. He specialized in Old Testament exegesis and was the author the highly acclaimed "Geschichte des Alten Testamentes in der christlichen Kirche" (History of the Old Testament in the Christian Church), (1868). Other noted works by Diestel include:
 Der Segen Jakob's in Genesis, xlix historisch erläutert. (Jacob's Blessing in Genesis, historically explained); CA Schwetschke & Son, Brunswick, 1853
 Die Sintflut und die Flutsagen des Alterthums (The deluge and flood legends of ancient times); C. Habel, 1871

His wife was Sophie Henriette Emmy Antonie Delius (1844 – 1923). The couple had three daughters and three sons each. His daughter Meta was a well-known German oratorio and cantata singer.

References 
  English translation

External link

1825 births
1879 deaths
19th-century German Protestant theologians
Writers from Königsberg
Academic staff of the University of Jena
Academic staff of the University of Greifswald
Academic staff of the University of Tübingen
German male non-fiction writers
19th-century male writers